OGM may refer to:
 Ontonagon County Airport, an airport located in Michigan
 Ogg § OGM, a discouraged extension to the Ogg file format.